Where'd You Go may refer to:

 Where'd You Go? (The Mighty Mighty Bosstones EP), 1991
 The title track from Where'd You Go?
 "Where'd You Go" (Fort Minor song), 2006
 "Where'd You Go" a song by Destiny's Child from The Writing's on the Wall, 1999